Monte San Lorenzo, also known as Monte Cochrane, is a mountain on the border between Argentina and Chile in Patagonia, reaching a height of . The Chilean name of Cochrane comes from the nearby town of Cochrane where climbers often approach the mountain. The peak was first climbed by Alberto María de Agostini in 1943.

The mountain is covered by three large glaciers (two in Argentina and one in Chile). The Argentine glaciers show clear evidence of retreat.

Incident
The peak gained further notoriety in 2014 when professional ski-mountaineers JP Auclair and Andreas Fransson perished on its slopes in a large avalanche.

Gallery

See also
 List of peaks by prominence
 List of Ultras of South America

References

Mountains of Aysén Region
Landforms of Santa Cruz Province, Argentina
Mountains of Argentina
Argentina–Chile border
International mountains of South America
Three-thousanders of the Andes